Mardan Division is one of seven divisions in Pakistan's Khyber Pakhtunkhwa province. It consists of two districts: Mardan and Swabi. According to the 2017 Pakistani Census, the division had a population of 3,997,667, making it the fourth-most populous division in the province, but it only spans  of area, which makes it the smallest division by area in the province as well. Mardan, with over 350,000 people, is the division's namesake and most populous city. The division borders Hazara Division, Malakand Division, and Peshawar Division. The division does not have a single public airport.

Districts

Districts are the administrative unit one level below divisions in the administrative hierarchy of Pakistan. Mardan Division consists of the following two districts:

History 

The area which covers Mardan Division today was carved out of Peshawar District between the 1931 and 1941 censuses of British India. The newly demarcated area was a Trans-Indus district called Mardan District. It consisted of two tehsils, Mardan Tehsil and Swabi Tehsil, which would later become the two districts that make up Mardan Division today.

This setup continued until One Unit, a geopolitical policy that abolished the provinces making up West Pakistan and consolidated West Pakistan into one province. After the One Unit policy ended in 1970 and the provinces returned with their original forms, the divisions that had been created as a result of the policy stayed in the North-West Frontier Province, which meant Mardan District stayed in Peshawar Division.

The area received full-fledged division status between the Pakistani censuses of 1981 and 1998, and during the same time period, Swabi Tehsil was also upgraded, to district status (becoming Swabi District).

In August 2000, the division was abolished along with every other division in the country, but was reinstated (with all the other divisions of Pakistan) eight years later after the elections of 2008.

Geography 

The area of the division is split rather evenly across both districts, with Mardan District taking up 51.4% of the area of the division, and Swabi District takes up the remaining .

The division borders the important Indus River to its south and east, and has an abundance of natural beauty.

Surrounding areas 

To Mardan Division's north and northwest, you will find Malakand Division, to the division's west and southwest, Peshawar Division can be found. To the southeast of Mardan Division, Rawalpindi Division in the province of Punjab can be found, and Mardan Division borders the Hazara Division to its east.

Demographics 

As of the 2017 Census of Pakistan, the division had a population of 3,997,667, out of which there were 2,016,397 males, 1,981,159 females, and 121 people who identified as Transgender; this made the sex ratio of the division 1,018 males for every 1,000 females.

The largest city in Mardan Division is its namesake, Mardan. Mardan had a population of 358,604 in 2017 and was the second-largest city in the entire province (after Peshawar) at the time. Swabi was the second-largest city in the division, and it had a population of 123,412 and was the eighth-largest city in the province. The next three most-populous cities in the division were Takht-i-Bahi, in Mardan District, with a population of 80,721, Topi, in Swabi District, with a population of 52,983, and Tordher, in Swabi District, with a population of 41,420. The whole division had seven municipalities in 2017, with five of them being concentrated in Swabi District.

The division has one cantonment, the Mardan Cantonment, adjacent to the city of Mardan which had a population of 6,871, making up the division's entire military population. This made only 0.17% of the entire population of the division active military personnel (one of the smallest military-civilian ratios in all of Pakistan).

In 1998, the dominant language in the division was Pashto, with over 97% of the population speaking it as their mother tongue.

In 2014 - 2015, Mardan Division had a literacy rate of roughly 51%, below the national average of 60%, and just below the provincial average of 53%.

Climate 

The climate of Mardan Division varies depending on where you are in the division. In the western part of the division, towards Mardan District and the city of Mardan, the summers are hot, the winters are mild and dry, and little rainfall falls through the year. Here the climate is classified as a BSh (or a hot semi-arid climate) by the Köppen climate classification. In the eastern part of the division, towards Swabi District and the city of Swabi, the summers are hot and long and the winters are dry and cool. Here the climate is classified as a Cwa (or a humid subtropical climate) by the Köppen classification.

See also 

 Divisions of Pakistan
 Divisions of Khyber Pakhtunkhwa
 Bannu Division
 Dera Ismail Khan Division
 Hazara Division
 Kohat Division
 Malakand Division
 Peshawar Division
 Mardan District
 Mardan
 Swabi District
 Swabi
 Administrative units of Pakistan
 Districts of Khyber Pakhtunkhwa

References

Divisions of Khyber Pakhtunkhwa